Nana Boakye-Yiadom may refer to:

Nana Boakye-Yiadom (footballer) (born 1996), English footballer
Nana Boakye-Yiadom (journalist) (born 1983), Ghanaian journalist